Mehdixanlı (also, Mekhdikhanly and Mekhtikhanly) is a village and municipality in the Barda Rayon of Azerbaijan.  It has a population of 178.

References 

Populated places in Barda District